Abortion in Ohio is legal in some cases, as determined by a so called "Heartbeat bill". This bill states a person who intends to perform or induce an abortion on a pregnant woman shall determine whether the fetus has a detectable heartbeat, which would be detectable as soon as 6 weeks into the pregnancy. If the "heartbeat" is present, the abortion procedure is illegal. This terminology is highly contested by medical professionals, as a conceptus is not called a fetus until after ten weeks of pregnancy (well after the proposed 6 weeks of the bill), before which the proper term is an embryo. additionally, the embryo has no heart at this stage of development, and as such, the "fetal heartbeat" is more accurately described as a collection of cells with electrical activity.   

Since 2021, abortions in the city of Lebanon, Ohio have been outlawed at all stages of pregnancy by a local ordinance. Mason, Ohio, also banned abortion at all stages in 2021, but its ordinance doing so was repealed later that year.

On April 11, 2019, Ohio Governor Mike DeWine signed the Human Rights and Heartbeat Protection Act, which bans abortion in Ohio after any embryonic cardiac activity is detected. On June 24, 2022, after the Supreme Court of the United States overturned Roe v. Wade, judge Michael R. Barrett lifted a preliminary injunction that had blocked state officials from enforcing the law against certain abortion providers, allowing the Human Rights and Heartbeat Protection Act to take full-effect. The law of Ohio imposes felony criminal liability on anyone who performs or aids or abets an abortion after embryonic cardiac activity can be detected.  

On September 15, 2022, a Hamilton County Common Pleas Court judge granted a 14-day restraining order against the state law prohibiting doctors from performing abortions after electrical "cardiac" activity is found, pausing a law that took effect after federal abortion protections were overturned by the U.S. Supreme Court in June. On October 7, the judge granted a motion for preliminary injunction against the abortion bans. The decision means abortions through 22 weeks’ gestation could continue, in keeping with state law in place before the ban. “S.B. 23 clearly discriminates against pregnant women and places an enormous burden on them to secure safe and effective health care such that it violates Ohio’s Equal Protection and Benefit Clause and is therefore unconstitutional,” Judge Christian A. Jenkins wrote in his order.

Current Ohio law 
Ohio has multiple layers of law which make abortion illegal, resulting from multiple laws passed over the decades. The list below ranges from most strict to least.

However, abortions up to 22 weeks are currently legal in Ohio, and will remain legal indefinitely as litigation continues. This is the result of a decision by the Hamilton County Court of Common Pleas. Legal proceedings are ongoing, however, so if you or a loved one wish to access updated information about abortion in Ohio please contact a reproductive health provider.

An Ohio state law went into effect in July 2019 which makes abortion illegal after embryonic cardiac activity can be detected, which usually develops between five or six weeks after conception. No exceptions are made for "hard cases" such as rape, incest, or a fetus determined to possibly have Down syndrome. The only "hard case" exception, according to ORC 2919.193(B), is a medical emergency, defined in 2919.16(F) & (K): "serious risk of the substantial and irreversible impairment of a major bodily function of the pregnant woman." This does not include potential bodily damage to the woman's mental health.

Included in this law, ORC 2919.198, is a section called "Immunity of pregnant woman." This section overrides penalties for pregnant women who undertake an abortion after embryonic cardiac activity has been detected. This release of penalties does not extend to physicians or doctors who administers the abortion past detectable cardiac activity.

Despite the above laws being the most restrictive, further penalties can be imposed if abortion is undertaken even later into the pregnancy.

According to ORC 2919.17, abortion may not be performed after viability. ORC 2919.16 defines "Viable means the stage of development of a human fetus at which in the determination of a physician, based on the particular facts of a woman's pregnancy that are known to the physician and in light of medical technology and information reasonably available to the physician, there is a realistic possibility of the maintaining and nourishing of a life outside of the womb with or without temporary artificial life-sustaining support." ORC 2919.17(E) extends: "there is a rebuttable presumption that an unborn child of at least twenty-four weeks gestational age is viable."

According to ORC 2919.201, Abortion after the gestational age of 20 weeks, abortion may not be performed after 20 weeks into the pregnancy. Immunity is not provided in a separate section similar to ORC 2919.198.

Context 
According to a 2017 report from the Center for Reproductive Rights and Ibis Reproductive Health, states that tried to pass additional constraints on a woman's ability to access legal abortions had fewer policies supporting women's health, maternal health and children's health. These states also tended to resist expanding Medicaid, family leave, medical leave, and sex education in public schools. According to Megan Donovan, a senior policy manager at the Guttmacher Institute, states with legislation that protects a woman's right to access abortion services have the lowest rates of infant mortality in the United States. In 2017, Georgia, Ohio, Missouri, Louisiana, Alabama and Mississippi had among the highest rates of infant mortality in the United States. In 2017, Ohio had an infant mortality rate of 7.2 deaths per 1,000 live births.

History

Legislative history 
By the end of the 1800s, all states in the Union except Louisiana had therapeutic exceptions in their legislative bans on abortions. In 1978, Akron, Ohio, passed a city ordinance that restricted abortion rights.

The state was one of 23 states in 2007 to have a detailed abortion-specific informed consent requirement. Mississippi, Nebraska, North Dakota and Ohio all had statutes in 2007 that required specific informed consent on abortion but also, by statute, allowed medical doctors performing abortions to disassociate themselves with the anti-abortion materials they were required to provide to their female patients. The Ohio legislature was one of five states nationwide that tried, and failed, to pass a "fetal heartbeat" bill in 2013. Only North Dakota successfully passed such a law, but it was later struck down by the courts. They tried with this type of legislation again unsuccessfully in 2018.

Among those who believe that abortion is murder, some believe it may be appropriate to punish it with death. While attempts to criminalize abortion generally focus on the doctor, Texas state Rep. Tony Tinderholt (R) introduced a bill in 2017 and 2019 that may enable the death penalty in Texas for women who have abortions, and the Ohio legislature considered a similar bill in 2018.

In Ohio, a "fetal heartbeat" law, HB 125, was introduced in the state legislature in October 2011. It was the only state in the country to try to pass such legislation that year. The bill was shelved by the Republican majority Senate to avoid controversy. This bill was notably supported by John C. Willke. A related law was signed in Ohio in 2013 by Governor John Kasich, which mandates, among other things, that doctors who do not test for embryonic cardiac activity when a patient seeks an abortion, tell the patient in writing if there is embryonic cardiac activity, and then tell them the statistical likelihood that the fetus could be carried to term, are subject to criminal penalties; specifically, "The doctor's failure to do so would be a first-degree misdemeanor, carrying up to six months in jail, for the first violation and a fourth-degree felony, carrying up to 18 months in jail, for subsequent violations." A bill similar to the 2011–2012 bill was introduced by Christina Hagan in 2013, titled HB 248. A further "fetal heartbeat" law was introduced on August 14, 2013, by Lynn Wachtmann and others. In 2013, Ohio passed a Targeted Regulation of Abortion Providers (TRAP) bill containing provisions related to admitting privileges and licensing and requiring clinics to have a transfer agreement with a hospital. "Fetal heartbeat" bills appeared again in the state legislature in 2014. On March 25, 2015, another "heartbeat" bill (House Bill 69) passed the Ohio House of Representatives. The Guardian reported that "The bill is unlikely to go any further, facing stiff opposition in the senate as well as from John Kasich, the Republican governor of Ohio." On December 6, 2016, the Ohio Senate added a heartbeat ban provision to an unrelated bill, House Bill 493, previously passed by the Ohio House of Representatives. The bill was returned to the House and passed by the House the same day. The bill as passed would make abortion after the detection of embryonic cardiac activity a fifth-degree felony except in cases where a physician judges the abortion necessary "to prevent the death of the pregnant woman or to prevent a serious risk of the substantial and irreversible impairment of a major bodily function of the pregnant woman." On December 13, 2016, Kasich vetoed the bill. Attempts to pass a "fetal heartbeat" law continued in 2016, with Ohio being one of eight states nationwide that tried and failed to pass such legislation.

In early 2018, the House considered a bill passed by the Senate to ban abortion after 13 weeks and require that fetal remains be cremated or buried. In 2018, the state was one of eleven where the legislature introduced a bill that failed to pass that would have banned abortion in almost all cases.

Nationally, 2019 was one of the most active years for state legislatures in terms of trying to pass abortion rights restrictions. State governments with Republican majorities started to push these bills after Brett Kavanaugh was confirmed as a US Supreme Court judge, replacing the more liberal Anthony Kennedy. These state governments generally saw this as a positive sign that new moves to restrict abortion rights would be less likely to face resistance in the courts. Two "fetal heartbeat" bills were introduced in the Ohio General Assembly in 2019, marking the 133rd Session of the Ohio General Assembly as the fifth time such legislation has been proposed in the state. On February 11, 2019, Candice Keller and Ron Hood filed HB 68, which was introduced in the Ohio House of Representatives on February 12, 2019. On February 12, 2019, Kristina Roegner filed SB 23 in the Ohio Senate; the bill was referred to the Health, Human Services and Medicaid Committee on February 13, 2019. On February 21, 2019, the President of the Ohio Senate, Larry Obhof pledged to pass SB 23 out of the upper chamber stating, "We are going to pass that bill by the middle of March. I have no doubt at all." On March 13, 2019, SB 23 was passed out of the Ohio Senate by a vote of 19 to 13. The next month, the Ohio House amended the bill, and passed it, 56–40; the changes were ratified in the Senate, 18–13. The bill was signed into law by Governor Mike DeWine on April 11, 2019. At the time the bill passed, only 27% of the state legislators were female. The law, slated to go into effect in July 2019, would make abortion illegal after embryonic cardiac activity can be detected, usually between five or six weeks into the pregnancy. No exceptions for cases of rape or incest are made.

In July 2019 a federal judge temporarily enjoined the state's officials, and the County Prosecutors of Cuyahoga, Hamilton, Franklin, Richland, Mahoning, Montgomery, and Lucas Counties, from enforcing this prohibition against the state's abortion providers. This injunction does not, however, prevent County Prosecutors outside Cuyahoga, Hamilton, Franklin, Richland, Mahoning, Montgomery, and Lucas Counties from enforcing the criminal prohibition on post-embryonic cardiac activity abortions, nor does it prevent them from prosecuting individuals or organizations that aid or abet abortions after embryonic cardiac activity, which remains a criminal offense under Ohio law.

In November 2019, a bill was introduced by Candice Keller and Ron Hood, House Bill 413, which would if made into law ban abortion outright and require doctors to reimplant an ectopic pregnancy, a medical procedure that obstetricians and gynecologists contend is currently impossible.

In 2020 a bill was signed into law in Ohio requiring all aborted fetal tissue to be cremated or buried.

In 2021 the city of Lebanon, Ohio, passed an ordinance whereby abortion at all stages of pregnancy was outlawed. Mason, Ohio, also banned abortion at all stages in 2021, but its ordinance was repealed later that year.

Judicial history 
In 1913 in the case of State v. Tipple, the Ohio Supreme Court said, "The reason and policy of the statute are to protect women and unborn babes from dangerous criminal practice, and to discourage secret immorality between the sexes, and a vicious and craven custom amongst married pairs who wish to evade the responsibilities of rearing offspring." The US Supreme Court's decision in 1973's Roe v. Wade ruling meant the state could no longer regulate abortion in the first trimester; however, the Supreme Court overturned Roe v. Wade in Dobbs v. Jackson Women's Health Organization,  later in 2022.

In Akron v. Akron Center for Reproductive Health, 462 U.S. 416 (1983), the Supreme Court declared unconstitutional an ordinance requiring second-trimester abortions to be performed in hospitals, and requiring patients seeking abortions to be informed of the status of the pregnancy, stage of fetal development, expected date of viability, health risks of abortion, and the availability of adoption agencies and childbirth resources. The Supreme Court also declared unconstitutional provisions in the ordinance requiring women to wait 24 hours after seeking an abortion, requiring parental consent for minors seeking abortions, and requiring that aborted fetuses be disposed of in a "humane" and "sanitary" manner.

The Supreme Court later overruled Akron v. Akron Center for Reproductive Health, 462 U.S. 416 (1983), in Planned Parenthood v. Casey, 505 U.S. 833 (1992).

Clinic history 

Between 1982 and 1992, the number of abortion clinics in the state decreased by ten, going from 55 in 1982 to 45 in 1992. In 2014, there were twelve abortion clinics in the state. In 2014, 93% of the counties in the state did not have an abortion clinic. That year, 56% of women in the state aged 15–44 lived in a county without an abortion clinic. In March 2016, there were 28 Planned Parenthood clinics in the state. In 2017, there were 27 Planned Parenthood clinics serving a population of 2,585,171 women aged 15–49. Three of the Planned Parenthood clinics offered abortion services.

Statistics 
In the period between 1972 and 1974, the state had an illegal abortion mortality rate per million women aged 15–44 of between 0.1 and 0.9. In 1990, 1,314,000 women in the state faced the risk of an unintended pregnancy. In 2010, the state had nine publicly funded abortions, of which nine were federally funded and none were state funded. In 2014, 48% of adults said in a poll by the Pew Research Center that abortion should be legal in all or most cases.

The number of abortion clinics in Ohio has declined over the years, with 55 in 1982, 45 in 1992 and 12 in 2014. There were 21,186 legal abortions in 2014 and 20,976 in 2015.

Abortion rights views and activities

Protests 
Women from the state participated in marches supporting abortion rights as part of a #StoptheBans movement in May 2019. In May 2019, women participated in a heartbeat ban bill protest in Cleveland as part of #StoptheBans movement. It was organized by NARAL Pro Choice Ohio, Planned Parenthood Advocates of Ohio and Cleveland State University students. A #StoptheBans protest in Cincinnati saw dozens of people participating outside the Hamilton County Courthouse where they chanted "Right to life, that's a lie, you don't care if women die".

Opposition to abortion

Local laws restricting/banning abortion 
In 1978, Akron, Ohio, passed a city ordinance that restricted abortion rights.

In 2021 the city of Lebanon, Ohio, passed an ordinance whereby abortion at all stages of pregnancy was outlawed. Mason, Ohio, also banned abortion at all stages in 2021, but its ordinance was repealed later that year.

Violence 
The first clinic arson occurred in Oregon in March 1976 and the first bombing occurred in February 1978 in Ohio. In 1978, there were three arson attacks and four bomb attacks on abortion facilities in the United States. All but two of these took place in Ohio. These seven attacks caused combined damage of US$800,000.

In 1977, there were four arson attacks on abortion clinics. These took place in Minnesota, Vermont, Nebraska and Ohio. Combined, they caused over US$1.1 million in damage. By 2000, an act of violence had taken place at an abortion clinic in Shelby County, Ohio. On March 7, 2016, Rachel Ann Jackson, 71, vandalized a Planned Parenthood clinic in Columbus, Ohio, with the message "SATAN DEN OF BABY KILLERS..." She pleaded guilty to felony counts of breaking and entering and vandalism and a misdemeanor count of aggravated trespass. Jackson was sentenced to probation, with the judge citing her struggle with serious mental illness as a mitigating factor.

Sanctuary Cities for the unborn 
The city of Lebanon, Ohio, in 2021 outlawed most abortions within its city boundaries and declared itself a "sanctuary city for the unborn". The Lebanon ordinance declares abortion to be "a murderous act of violence that purposefully and knowingly terminates a human life," and it outlaws abortion "at all times and at all stages of pregnancy." The only exception is for abortions performed "in response to a life-threatening physical condition aggravated by, caused by, or arising from a pregnancy" that "places the woman in danger of death or a serious risk of substantial impairment of a major bodily function unless an abortion is performed." The ordinance was adopted by a unanimous vote of the Lebanon city council on May 25, 2021.

The city council of Mason adopted a similar ordinance outlawing most abortions within city limits on October 25, 2021. The ordinance also declares abortion-inducing drugs to be contraband and outlaws their possession and distribution within city limits. Violators are subject to punishment of up to 180 days in jail and a fine of up to $1,000. On December 13, 2021, the city council of Mason voted to repeal this ordinance.

See also 
 Pregnancy of unnamed 10-year old Ohio girl in 2022

References 

Ohio
Healthcare in Ohio
Women in Ohio